Raphia is a genus of moths of the family Noctuidae.  It is the only genus under subfamily Raphiinae. They occur in southern Europe, temperate Asia, and North America.

Species
 Raphia aethiops
 Raphia approximata
 Raphia corax
 Raphia frater Grote, 1864
 Raphia hybris Hübner, 1813
 Raphia illarioni
 Raphia obsoleta
 Raphia peusteria  Püngeler, 1907

References

 Natural History Museum Lepidoptera genus database
 Raphia at funet.fi

Noctuidae
 
Taxa named by Jacob Hübner